The International Racquetball Federation's 18th Racquetball World Championships were held in Cali, Colombia, from July 15 to 23, 2016. This was the first time Worlds were in Colombia, and the first time a South American country hosted the event since 1998, when Cochabamba, Bolivia, was the host city.

Mexican Paola Longoria won her third World Championship in women's singles, which ties her with Cheryl Gudinas and Michelle Gould for most World Championships in women's singles. Ana Gabriela Martinez of Guatemala was Longoria's opponent in the final, and she was a surprise finalist, as she was only 16 years old, although she was the World Junior Champion in girl's U16. Also, neither American player – Michelle Key nor Rhonda Rajsich – made the podium, which was the first time a USA woman had not finished in the top three in World Championship history.

Tournament format
The 2016 World Championships used a two-stage format with an initial group stage that was a round robin with the results used to seed players for a medal round.

Round robin

Pool A

Pool B

Pool C

Pool D

Pool E

Pool F

Pool G

Pool H

Medal round
Source

References

Women's singles